The Czech Republic–Germany border is the international border between the Czech Republic and Germany. It forms a  arc extending from Austria at the south to Poland at the north.

Rivers
Several rivers cross this border, or form portions of it. These include:
Chamb
Pfreimd
Wondreb
Ohře
Regnitz 
White Elster
Natzschung
Flöha 
Wilde Weißeritz
Müglitz 
Biela
Elbe
Spree
Mandau
Lausitzer Neiße

History
The border comes from the border of the Lands of the Bohemian Crown, which later became the border between the German Empire and the Austrian Empire.

In the period 1945–1990, the West German–Czechoslovak border formed part of the Iron curtain and was heavily fenced and strictly guarded.

The Czech Republic joined the Schengen Area in 2007. This meant that all passport checks were removed along the border in December 2007. The limitations on Czechs working in Germany expired in April 2011.

See also
Czechoslovakian border fortifications during the Cold War

Notes

Further reading

External links

Border lines Germany – Czech Republic (railways)

 
European Union internal borders
Borders of the Czech Republic
Borders of Germany
International borders